The Parc Bit is a science and technology park located in the outskirts of the city of Palma de Mallorca, Spain. Many innovation research centres of enterprises related with tourism are placed here, such as Trivago or Microsoft.

It was opened in 2002 and currently around 2,500 employees work there. It is located near the University of the Balearic Islands.

References 

Palma de Mallorca